Nonlabens ulvanivorans is a Gram-negative, strictly aerobic, rod-shaped, chemoorganotrophic and non-motile bacterium from the genus of Nonlabens which has been isolated from the faeces of the sea slug Aplysia punctata.

References

Flavobacteria
Bacteria described in 2011